District 4 is an electoral district in Malta.  It was established in 1921. Its boundaries have changed many times but it currently consists of the localities of Gudja, Paola, Santa Luċija, Tarxien and part of Fgura.

Representatives

References 

 

Districts of Malta